Against the Law is an American legal comedy-drama television series that aired on the Fox network from September 23, 1990, until April 5, 1991.  Starring Michael O'Keefe and Suzzanne Douglas,  the series centered on the brash Boston lawyer, Simon MacHeath, who left his job at a prestigious law firm to start his own defense practice.

Seventeen one-hour episodes were broadcast from September 23, 1990, to April 5, 1991.

Cast
 Michael O'Keefe as Simon MacHeath
 Suzzanne Douglas as Yvette Carruthers
 Elizabeth Ruscio as Elizabeth Verhagen
 Rosalind Chao as Toy Feng
 M. C. Gainey as J.T. "Miggsy" Meigs
 Fritz Weaver as Skipper Haverhill
 Barbara Williams as Phoebe
 Lance Norris as the SWAT Team Leader

Episodes

References

External links
 

1990s American comedy-drama television series
1990 American television series debuts
1991 American television series endings
Fox Broadcasting Company original programming
1990s American legal television series
Television series by MGM Television
English-language television shows
Television shows set in Boston